Deane Buckboro (born 3 September 1953) is a Canadian former swimmer. He competed in two events at the 1972 Summer Olympics.

References

1953 births
Living people
Canadian male swimmers
Olympic swimmers of Canada
Swimmers at the 1972 Summer Olympics
People from Grande Prairie
Sportspeople from Alberta